The Epitaph of Gllavenica is a 14th-century epitaph, written on a shroud, and embroidered by a monk named Savia from Ballsh, Albania. Its name stems from the ancient name of Ballsh. The shroud is made of silk, linen and gold, and symbolizes the burial cloth of Jesus, used in Orthodox Good Friday's processions.

Technically, stylistically and in the decorative motifs, it is one of the most perfect artifacts of this genre in the Balkans. The Epitaph represents the dead Christ lying on a linen, Saint Mary, John, other Four Evangelists, prophets and angels with spread wings. It was commissioned by the Albanian ruler Gjergj Arianiti in 1373.

In 1994, the shroud was stolen from the National Historical Museum of Albania in Tirana.

In 2005 an international symposium assessed that the shroud should be restored for the amount of 25-50k Euros because it risks to be irreparably deteriorated and damaged from the lights of the Albanian National Museum.

References

Sources
Stamati, Frederik, Acta Studia Albanica (2/2005) The Epitaph of Gllavenica: New Data Emerging from the Technological Study 

1373 works
Albanian art
Albanian language
Albanian culture
Embroidery